The 1994–95 Danish Cup was the 41st installment of the Danish Cup, the highest football competition in Denmark.

Final

References

1994-95
1994–95 domestic association football cups
Cup